Frederick Charles Stevens (June 5, 1856 - March 14, 1916) was an American politician from New York  who served in the state senate and state legislature as well as Superintendent of Public Works.

Early life
Born in Attica, Wyoming County, New York, Stevens attended Attica Collegiate Institute and Cornell University but left without degree due to ill health. He traveled west and worked for the Missouri–Kansas–Texas Railroad of which his father was a large stockholder.

Career
When he returned to Attica, he established the Maplewood Stock Farm and raised prize-winning stock and also engaged in banking. He was a member of the New York State Senate (46th D.) from 1903 to 1906, sitting in the 126th, 127th, 128th and 129th New York State Legislatures. He was appointed Chairman of the Committee on Roads and Bridges and was a member of Finance, Villages, Banks, and Agriculture.

As Superintendent of Public Works Stevens served from 1907 to 1911.

Death
Stevens died on March 14, 1916, in a barn on his farm in Attica, "from apoplexy", and is interred at the Forest Hill Cemetery there.

Family life
Stevens was the son of Congressman Robert S. Stevens (1824–1893) and Mary P. (Smith) Stevens, he married Miss Isabelle C. Sproule in Hannibal, Mo. Jan 15, 1879. They had four children, Frederick Charles Stevens, Jr., Robert Sproule Stevens, Marian Stevens, and Helen Lee Stevens Gregory.

References

External links
 Official New York from Cleveland to Hughes by Charles Elliott Fitch (Hurd Publishing Co., New York and Buffalo, 1911, Vol. IV; pg. 365f)
 The New York Red Book by Edgar L. Murlin (1903; pg. 97f)
 HUGHES NAMES STEVENS TO RUN PUBLIC WORKS in NYT on January 15, 1907
 FREDERICK C. STEVENS DIES in NYT on March 16, 1916

1856 births
1916 deaths
Republican Party New York (state) state senators
People from Attica, New York
19th-century American railroad executives
Cornell University alumni
19th-century American politicians